Scrambled Eggs is a cartoon produced by Walter Lantz Productions in 1939 by Universal Pictures featuring a mischievous satyr-like creature named Peterkin.

Production
This cartoon was production #984 for Walter Lantz Productions, the fourth in the Cartune Classics series.

The story is by Elaine Pogany, with designs and backgrounds by her husband Willy Pogany, both of whom are given prominent credit. There were no other Peterkin cartoons produced by Walter Lantz, although the character was featured the following year in a children's book called Peterkin, created together by the Poganys, with Elaine doing the story and Willy doing the artwork.

This cartoon was one of the first done in color by Lantz.  It can be  found in the Woody Woodpecker and Friends Classic Cartoon Collection DVD box set.

Story
It's dawn in the woods.  Mother and Father Swan, with their little cygnets, coast across a pond.  The Night Watchman of the forest, Mr. Owl, awakens.  He looks down at the sleeping Peterkin, a young boy faun, and wonders what mischief he will get into today.  Peterkin wakes up, and, prodded by a croaking frog, picks up his flute and starts to play it loudly.  When the mother birds in their nests up above tell him to "Be quiet!" and boast about their own well-behaved families (i.e., their eggs), Peterkin decides to get back at them.

He sneaks up the massive "Maternity Tree", and covertly switches all the eggs in all the nests.  Soon, the eggs hatch — each bird couple has a baby bird of a type different from themselves: for example, the canaries hatch a pirate-talking parrot; the tiny English sparrows hatch a huge mockingbird, who quickly begins "mocking" the sparrow father by speaking in an English accent. The father birds, upset and very suspicious of their wives, fly off to "the club" to pout, while the mother birds "go home to mother".  This mass desertion by all the parent birds leave the baby birds hungry, and crying for food and attention.

Peterkin is the only one left to take care of them, a task he gamely tries, but one for which he finds he is totally unsuited.  Worn out, an exhausted Peterkin confesses his shenanigans to the father birds, hoping they will take over their parental duties.  However, the father birds are outraged and furious, and chase after a retreating Peterkin in order to catch and punish him.  In the end, all the families are restored to normal, and Peterkin is sentenced to laundry duty (presumably diapers).  But he tells the camera he'd  crossed his fingers when he had promised never to do any such mischief ever again.  So, not bound by his promise, Peterkin winks at the camera and says he'll find something mischievous to do tomorrow.

Cast
Marjorie Tarlton was the voice of Peterkin, and Sara Berner, though uncredited, was generally considered to have voiced the female bird characters. The male bird voices were done by Danny Webb and Victor McLeod.

Review
The cartoon is full of sight gags — for example, the occupant of one of the eggs is shown against a candling flame as a bored shadow playing a game of tic-tac-toe on the inside of the egg wall.  The cartoon is "cute" and "amusing" — it's also interesting "for the bright Technicolor spectrum, the beautiful forest background designs, some remarkably detailed tree trunks, and the artful designs found on each of the nests".

Some people may be offended by the racial stereotypes presented — the blackbird is depicted as speaking in a "Negro dialect" prevalent in many American cartoons of the 1930s.

The high artistry of the backgrounds by professional illustrator Will Pogany is obvious.  There's also a wide array of bird species depicted, each, though drawn in the Lantz cartoon style, obviously a distinctive avian type, including canaries, mockingbirds, English sparrows, parrots, finches, warblers, blackbirds, and, of course, a stork doctor. Foreshadowing the emergence in the next year of Walter Lantz's most popular character, Woody Woodpecker, there's even a woodpecker couple.

References

External links
   Scrambled Eggs webpage on the Internet Movie Database website

1939 films
1939 animated films
1930s American animated films
1930s animated short films
Walter Lantz Productions shorts
Films scored by Frank Marsales
Films directed by Alex Lovy
Animated films based on classical mythology
Animated films about birds
Animated films about animals
Universal Pictures short films
Universal Pictures animated short films